Stephanie J. Jones is an American lawyer, writer and former senior government official, and is the President of The Call to Justice Foundation.  She was the federal government's first Chief Opportunities Officer and the former Editor-in-Chief of The State of Black America.

Jones is the creator and author of Sunday Morning Apartheid: A Diversity Study of the Sunday Morning Talk Shows.

Early life 
Stephanie Jones grew up in Youngstown, Ohio, and later moved to Ridgewood, a village in New Jersey.  She is the daughter of Nathaniel R. Jones, retired Sixth Circuit Court of Appeals judge and former general counsel of the National Association for the Advancement of Colored People (NAACP).  She is the granddaughter of author Lorenz Graham and great-niece of Shirley Graham and W. E. B. DuBois.

Education 
Jones earned a bachelor's degree in English Literature and Afro-American studies from Smith College in Northampton, Massachusetts.  She earned her Juris Doctor degree from the University of Cincinnati College of Law, where she was a fellow in the Urban Morgan Institute for Human Rights.  She also attended Tuskegee Institute (now Tuskegee University).

Career 
Jones is the president and board member of The Call to Justice Foundation, a non-profit devoted to advancing the civil rights legacy of her father, Nathaniel R. Jones. She was the first chief opportunities officer in the federal government, appointed by Transportation Secretary Anthony Foxx. She also served as senior counsellor to the secretary and deputy chief of staff for the U.S. Department of Transportation. Jones is president of Stephanie Jones Strategies, LLC, a Washington, D.C. public affairs and strategic planning firm. Prior to starting her business, Jones was the executive director of the National Urban League Policy Institute and editor-in-chief of The State of Black America.

Jones is the creator and author of Sunday Morning Apartheid: A Diversity Study of the Sunday Morning Talk Shows. Following the release of the study, cable and network executives substantially increased the diversity of their talk show host and guest lineups.

She was previously chief counsel to Senator John Edwards from 2002 to 2005 and chief of staff to Representative Stephanie Tubbs Jones from 2000 to 2002. She served in the Clinton Administration as Secretary's Regional Representative in the U.S. Department of Education (Region V).
 
Before entering government service, Jones was an associate professor of Law at Northern Kentucky University's Salmon P. Chase College of Law, where she taught civil rights law, civil and criminal procedure, entertainment law, and trial advocacy. Jones has also served on the adjunct faculty of Northwestern University School of Law. She previously practiced law with the firm Graydon, Head & Ritchey in Cincinnati. Prior to her legal career, Jones was a staff reporter at the Cincinnati Post. During the early 1980s, she was personal assistant to Lionel Richie and The Commodores.

References

External links 

 The Call to Justice Foundation Website 
 Op-Ed: "If You Want to Honour Judge Jones, Stand on the Right Side of History," The Cincinnati Enquirer, February 4, 2020 
U.S. Department of Transportation Chief Opportunities Officer 
 Stephanie Jones Strategies Website 
 Op-Ed: "Thurgood Marshall's Legacy Deserves Cheers, Not Sneers," The Washington Post, June 30, 2010 
 Op-Ed: "Martin Luther King Tells Us Why the Mosque Must Be Built," The Washington Post, August 21, 2017 
 C-SPAN: Stephanie Jones on The State of Black America 
 C-SPAN: Stephanie Jones Discusses Campaign 2008 and Urban Issues 

American legal writers
African-American women lawyers
American women lawyers
African-American lawyers
People from Youngstown, Ohio
People from Ridgewood, New Jersey
University of Cincinnati College of Law alumni
Smith College alumni
Tuskegee University alumni
Ohio lawyers
Living people
Year of birth missing (living people)
21st-century American women writers
American women non-fiction writers
21st-century American non-fiction writers
21st-century African-American women writers
21st-century African-American writers